The law of war is the component of international law that regulates the conditions for initiating war (jus ad bellum) and the conduct of warring parties (jus in bello). Laws of war define sovereignty and nationhood, states and territories, occupation, and other critical terms of law.

Among other issues, modern laws of war address the declarations of war, acceptance of surrender and the treatment of prisoners of war; military necessity, along with distinction and proportionality; and the prohibition of certain weapons that may cause unnecessary suffering.

The law of war is considered distinct from other bodies of law—such as the domestic law of a particular belligerent to a conflict—which may provide additional legal limits to the conduct or justification of war.

Early sources and history

The first traces of a law of war come from the Babylonians. It is the Code of Hammurabi, king of Babylon, which in 1750 B.C., explains its laws imposing a code of conduct in the event of war:  In ancient India, the Mahabharata and the texts of Manou's law urged mercy on unarmed or wounded enemies. The Bible and the Qur'an also contain rules of respect for the adversary. It is always a matter of establishing rules that protect civilians and the defeated.

Attempts to define and regulate the conduct of individuals, nations, and other agents in war and to mitigate the worst effects of war have a long history. The earliest known instances are found in the Mahabharata and the Old Testament (Torah).

In the Indian subcontinent, the Mahabharata describes a discussion between ruling brothers concerning what constitutes acceptable behavior on a battlefield, an early example of the rule of proportionality:

An example from the Book of Deuteronomy 20:19–20 limits the amount of environmental damage, allowing only the cutting down of non-fruitful trees for use in the siege operation, while fruitful trees should be preserved for use as a food source:

Also, Deuteronomy 20:10–12 requires the Israelites to make an offer of conditioned peace to the opposing party before laying siege to their city, taking the population as servants and forced-laborers instead, shall they accept the offer. 

Similarly, Deuteronomy 21:10–14 requires that female captives who were forced to marry the victors of a war, then not desired anymore, be let go wherever they want, and requires them not to be treated as slaves nor be sold for money:

In the early 7th century, the first Sunni Muslim caliph, Abu Bakr, whilst instructing his Muslim army, laid down rules against the mutilation of corpses, killing children, females and the elderly. He also laid down rules against environmental harm to trees and slaying of the enemy's animals:

Furthermore, Sura Al-Baqara 2:190–193 of the Quran requires that in combat Muslims are only allowed to strike back in self-defense against those who strike against them, but, on the other hand, once the enemies cease to attack, Muslims are then commanded to stop attacking:

In the history of the early Christian church, many Christian writers considered that Christians could not be soldiers or fight wars. Augustine of Hippo contradicted this and wrote about 'just war' doctrine, in which he explained the circumstances when war could or could not be morally justified.

In 697, Adomnan of Iona gathered Kings and church leaders from around Ireland and Scotland to Birr, where he gave them the 'Law of the Innocents', which banned killing women and children in war, and the destruction of churches.

In medieval Europe, the Roman Catholic Church also began promulgating teachings on just war, reflected to some extent in movements such as the Peace and Truce of God. The impulse to restrict the extent of warfare, and especially protect the lives and property of non-combatants continued with Hugo Grotius and his attempts to write laws of war.

One of the grievances enumerated in the American Declaration of Independence was that King George III "has endeavoured to bring on the inhabitants of our frontiers the merciless Indian Savages whose known rule of warfare is an undistinguished destruction of all ages, sexes and conditions".

Modern sources

The modern law of war is made up from three principal sources:

 Lawmaking treaties (or conventions)—see § International treaties on the laws of war below.
 Custom. Not all the law of war derives from or has been incorporated in such treaties, which can refer to the continuing importance of customary law as articulated by the Martens Clause. Such customary international law is established by the general practice of nations together with their acceptance that such practice is required by law.
 General Principles. "Certain fundamental principles provide basic guidance. For instance, the principles of distinction, proportionality, and necessity, all of which are part of customary international law, always apply to the use of armed force".

Positive international humanitarian law consists of treaties (international agreements) that directly affect the laws of war by binding consenting nations and achieving widespread consent.

The opposite of positive laws of war is customary laws of war, many of which were explored at the Nuremberg War Trials. These laws define both the permissive rights of states as well as prohibitions on their conduct when dealing with irregular forces and non-signatories.

The Treaty of Armistice and Regularization of War signed on November 25 and 26, 1820 between the president of the Republic of Colombia, Simón Bolívar and the Chief of the Military Forces of the Spanish Kingdom, Pablo Morillo, is the precursor of the International Humanitarian Law.  The Treaty of Guadalupe Hidalgo, signed and ratified by the United States and Mexico in 1848, articulates rules for any future wars, including protection of civilians and treatment of prisoners of war. The Lieber Code, promulgated by the Union during the American Civil War, was critical in the development of the laws of land warfare. 

Historian Geoffrey Best called the period from 1856 to 1909 the law of war's "epoch of highest repute." The defining aspect of this period was the establishment, by states, of a positive legal or legislative foundation (i.e., written) superseding a regime based primarily on religion, chivalry, and customs. It is during this "modern" era that the international conference became the forum for debate and agreement between states and the "multilateral treaty" served as the positive mechanism for codification.

The Nuremberg War Trial judgment on "The Law Relating to War Crimes and Crimes Against Humanity" held, under the guidelines Nuremberg Principles, that treaties like the Hague Convention of 1907, having been widely accepted by "all civilised nations" for about half a century, were by then part of the customary laws of war and binding on all parties whether the party was a signatory to the specific treaty or not.

Interpretations of international humanitarian law change over time and this also affects the laws of war. For example, Carla Del Ponte, the chief prosecutor for the International Criminal Tribunal for the former Yugoslavia pointed out in 2001 that although there is no specific treaty ban on the use of depleted uranium projectiles, there is a developing scientific debate and concern expressed regarding the effect of the use of such projectiles and it is possible that, in future, there may be a consensus view in international legal circles that use of such projectiles violates general principles of the law applicable to use of weapons in armed conflict. This is because in the future it may be the consensus view that depleted uranium projectiles breach one or more of the following treaties: The Universal Declaration of Human Rights; the Charter of the United Nations; the Genocide Convention; the United Nations Convention Against Torture; the Geneva Conventions including Protocol I; the Convention on Conventional Weapons of 1980; the Chemical Weapons Convention; and the Convention on the Physical Protection of Nuclear Material.

Purposes of the laws

It has often been commented that creating laws for something as inherently lawless as war seems like a lesson in absurdity. But based on the adherence to what amounted to customary international law by warring parties through the ages, it was believed  that codifying laws of war would be beneficial.

Some of the central principles underlying laws of war are:
 Wars should be limited to achieving the political goals that started the war (e.g., territorial control) and should not include unnecessary destruction.
 Wars should be brought to an end as quickly as possible.
 People and property that do not contribute to the war effort should be protected against unnecessary destruction and hardship.

To this end, laws of war are intended to mitigate the hardships of war by:
 Protecting both combatants and non-combatants from unnecessary suffering.
 Safeguarding certain fundamental human rights of persons who fall into the hands of the enemy, particularly prisoners of war, the wounded and sick, children, and civilians.
 Facilitating the restoration of peace.

The idea that there is a right to war concerns, on the one hand, the jus ad bellum, the right to make war or to enter war, assuming a motive such as to defend oneself from a threat or danger, presupposes a declaration of war that warns the adversary: war is a loyal act, and on the other hand, jus in bello, the law of war, the way of making war, which involves behaving as soldiers invested with a mission for which all violence is not allowed. In any case, the very idea of a right to war is based on an idea of war that can be defined as an armed conflict, limited in space, limited in time, and by its objectives. War begins with a declaration (of war), ends with a treaty (of peace) or surrender agreement, an act of sharing, etc.

Principles of the laws of war

Military necessity, along with distinction, proportionality, humanity (sometimes called unnecessary suffering), and honor  (sometimes called chivalry) are the five most commonly cited principles of international humanitarian law governing the legal use of force in an armed conflict.

Military necessity is governed by several constraints: an attack or action must be intended to help in the defeat of the enemy; it must be an attack on a legitimate military objective, and the harm caused to civilians or civilian property must be proportional and not excessive in relation to the concrete and direct military advantage anticipated.

Distinction is a principle under international humanitarian law governing the legal use of force in an armed conflict, whereby belligerents must distinguish between combatants and civilians.

Proportionality is a principle under international humanitarian law governing the legal use of force in an armed conflict, whereby belligerents must make sure that the harm caused to civilians or civilian property is not excessive in relation to the concrete and direct military advantage expected by an attack on a legitimate military objective.

Humanity. This principle is based in the Hague Conventions restrictions against using arms, projectiles, or materials calculated to cause suffering or injury manifestly disproportionate to the military advantage realized by the use of the weapon for legitimate military purposes. In some countries, like the United States, weapons are reviewed prior to their use in combat to determine if they comply with the law of war and are not designed to cause unnecessary suffering when used in their intended manner. This principle also prohibits using an otherwise lawful weapon in a manner that causes unnecessary suffering.

Honour is a principle that demands a certain amount of fairness and mutual respect between adversaries. Parties to a conflict must accept that their right to adopt means of injuring each other is not unlimited, they must refrain from taking advantage of the adversary's adherence to the law by falsely claiming the law's protections, and they must recognize that they are members of a common profession that fights not out of personal hostility but on behalf of their respective States.

Example substantive laws of war

To fulfill the purposes noted above, the laws of war place substantive limits on the lawful exercise of a belligerent's power. Generally speaking, the laws require that belligerents refrain from employing violence that is not reasonably necessary for military purposes and that belligerents conduct hostilities with regard for the principles of humanity and chivalry.

However, because the laws of war are based on consensus, the content and interpretation of such laws are extensive, contested, and ever-changing.

 The following are particular examples of some of the substance of the laws of war, as those laws are interpreted today.

Declaration of war

Section III of the Hague Convention of 1907 required hostilities to be preceded by a reasoned declaration of war or by an ultimatum with a conditional declaration of war.

Some treaties, notably the United Nations Charter (1945) Article 2, and other articles in the Charter, seek to curtail the right of member states to declare war; as does the older Kellogg–Briand Pact of 1928 for those nations who ratified it. Formal declarations of war have been uncommon since 1945 outside the Middle East and East Africa.

Lawful conduct of belligerent actors

Modern laws of war regarding conduct during war (jus in bello), such as the 1949 Geneva Conventions, provide that it is unlawful for belligerents to engage in combat without meeting certain requirements. Article 4(a)(2) of the Geneva Convention relative to the Treatment of Prisoners of War provides that Lawful Combatants are required
(a) That of being commanded by a person responsible for his subordinates;
(b) That of having a fixed distinctive sign recognizable at a distance;
(c) That of carrying arms openly; and
(d) That of conducting their operations in accordance with the laws and customs of war.

Impersonating enemy combatants by wearing the enemy's uniform is allowed, though fighting in that uniform is unlawful perfidy, as is the taking of hostages.

Combatants also must be commanded by a responsible officer. That is, a commander can be held liable in a court of law for the improper actions of their subordinates. There is an exception to this if the war came on so suddenly that there was no time to organize a resistance, e.g. as a result of a foreign occupation.

People parachuting from an aircraft in distress

Modern laws of war, specifically within Protocol I additional to the 1949 Geneva Conventions, prohibits attacking people parachuting from an aircraft in distress regardless of what territory they are over. Once they land in territory controlled by the enemy, they must be given an opportunity to surrender before being attacked unless it is apparent that they are engaging in a hostile act or attempting to escape. This prohibition does not apply to the dropping of airborne troops, special forces, commandos, spies, saboteurs, liaison officers, and intelligence agents. Thus, such personnel descending by parachutes are legitimate targets and, therefore, may be attacked, even if their aircraft is in distress.

Red Cross, Red Crescent, Magen David Adom, and the white flag

Modern laws of war, such as the 1949 Geneva Conventions, also include prohibitions on attacking doctors, ambulances or hospital ships displaying a Red Cross, a Red Crescent, Magen David Adom, Red Crystal, or other emblem related to the International Red Cross and Red Crescent Movement. It is also prohibited to fire at a person or vehicle bearing a white flag, since that indicates an intent to surrender or a desire to communicate.

In either case, people protected by the Red Cross/Crescent/Star or white flag are expected to maintain neutrality, and may not engage in warlike acts. In fact, engaging in war activities under a protected symbol is itself a violation of the laws of war known as perfidy. Failure to follow these requirements can result in the loss of protected status and make the individual violating the requirements a lawful target.

Applicability to states and individuals

The law of war is binding not only upon States as such but also upon individuals and, in particular, the members of their armed forces. Parties are bound by the laws of war to the extent that such compliance does not interfere with achieving legitimate military goals. For example, they are obliged to make every effort to avoid damaging people and property not involved in combat or the war effort, but they are not guilty of a war crime if a bomb mistakenly or incidentally hits a residential area.

By the same token, combatants that intentionally use protected people or property as human shields or camouflage are guilty of violations of the laws of war and are responsible for damage to those that should be protected.

Mercenaries 

The use of contracted combatants in warfare has been an especially tricky situation for the laws of war.  Some scholars claim that private security contractors appear so similar to state forces that it is unclear if acts of war are taking place by private or public agents. International law has yet to come to a consensus on this issue.

Remedies for violations

During conflict, punishment for violating the laws of war may consist of a specific, deliberate and limited violation of the laws of war in reprisal.

After a conflict ends, persons who have committed or ordered any breach of the laws of war, especially atrocities, may be held individually accountable for war crimes through process of law. Also, nations that signed the Geneva Conventions are required to search for, then try and punish, anyone who has committed or ordered certain "grave breaches" of the laws of war. (Third Geneva Convention, Article 129 and Article 130.)

Combatants who break specific provisions of the laws of war are termed unlawful combatants. Unlawful combatants who have been captured may lose the status and protections that would otherwise be afforded to them as prisoners of war, but only after a "competent tribunal" has determined that they are not eligible for POW status (e.g., Third Geneva Convention, Article 5.)  At that point, an unlawful combatant may be interrogated, tried, imprisoned, and even executed for their violation of the laws of war pursuant to the domestic law of their captor, but they are still entitled to certain additional protections, including that they be "treated with humanity and, in case of trial, shall not be deprived of the rights of fair and regular trial."  (Fourth Geneva Convention Article 5.)

International treaties on the laws of war

List of declarations, conventions, treaties, and judgments on the laws of war:
 1856 Paris Declaration Respecting Maritime Law abolished privateering.
 1863 United States military adopts the Lieber Code, a compilation of extant international norms on the treatment of civilians assembled by German scholar Franz Lieber.
 1864 Geneva Convention for the Amelioration of the Condition of the Wounded and Sick in Armed Forces in the Field.
 1868 St. Petersburg Declaration Renouncing the Use of Explosive projectiles Under 400  grams Weight.
 1874 Project of an International Declaration concerning the Laws and Customs of War (Brussels Declaration). Signed in Brussels 27 August. This agreement never entered into force, but formed part of the basis for the codification of the laws of war at the 1899 Hague Peace Conference.
 1880 Manual of the Laws and Customs of War at Oxford. At its session in Geneva in 1874 the Institute of International Law appointed a committee to study the Brussels Declaration of the same year and to submit to the Institute its opinion and supplementary proposals on the subject. The work of the Institute led to the adoption of the Manual in 1880 and it went on to form part of the basis for the codification of the laws of war at the 1899 Hague Peace Conference.
 1899 Hague Conventions consisted of three main sections and three additional declarations:
 I – Pacific Settlement of International Disputes
 II – Laws and Customs of War on Land
 III – Adaptation to Maritime Warfare of Principles of Geneva Convention of 1864
 Declaration I – On the Launching of Projectiles and Explosives from Balloons
 Declaration II – On the Use of Projectiles the Object of Which is the Diffusion of Asphyxiating or Deleterious Gases
 Declaration III – On the Use of Bullets Which Expand or Flatten Easily in the Human Body
 1907 Hague Conventions had thirteen sections, of which twelve were ratified and entered into force, and two declarations:
 I – The Pacific Settlement of International Disputes
 II – The Limitation of Employment of Force for Recovery of Contract Debts
 III – The Opening of Hostilities
 IV – The Laws and Customs of War on Land
 V – The Rights and Duties of Neutral Powers and Persons in Case of War on Land
 VI – The Status of Enemy Merchant Ships at the Outbreak of Hostilities
 VII – The Conversion of Merchant Ships into War-ships
 VIII – The Laying of Automatic Submarine Contact Mines
 IX – Bombardment by Naval Forces in Time of War
 X – Adaptation to Maritime War of the Principles of the Geneva Convention
 XI – Certain Restrictions with Regard to the Exercise of the Right of Capture in Naval War
 XII – The Creation of an International Prize Court [Not Ratified]*
 XIII – The Rights and Duties of Neutral Powers in Naval War
 Declaration I – extending Declaration II from the 1899 Conference to other types of aircraft
 Declaration II – on the obligatory arbitration
 1909 London Declaration concerning the Laws of Naval War largely reiterated existing law, although it showed greater regard to the rights of neutral entities. Never went into effect.
 1922 The Washington Naval Treaty, also known as the Five-Power Treaty (6 February)
 1923 Hague Draft Rules of Aerial Warfare. Never adopted in a legally binding form.
 1925 Geneva protocol for the Prohibition of the Use in War of Asphyxiating, Poisonous or Other Gases, and of Bacteriological Methods of Warfare.
 1927–1930 Greco-German arbitration tribunal
 1928 Kellogg-Briand Pact (also known as the Pact of Paris)
 1929 Geneva Convention, Relative to the treatment of prisoners of war.
 1929 Geneva Convention on the amelioration of the condition of the wounded and sick
 1930 Treaty for the Limitation and Reduction of Naval Armament (22 April)
 1935 Roerich Pact
 1936 Second London Naval Treaty (25 March)
 1938 Amsterdam Draft Convention for the Protection of Civilian Populations Against New Engines of War. This convention was never ratified.
 1938 League of Nations declaration for the "Protection of Civilian Populations Against Bombing From the Air in Case of War"
 1945 United Nations Charter (entered into force on October 24, 1945)
 1946 Judgment of the International Military Tribunal at Nuremberg
 1947 Nuremberg Principles formulated under UN General Assembly Resolution 177, 21 November 1947
 1948 United Nations Convention on the Prevention and Punishment of the Crime of Genocide
 1949 Geneva Convention I for the Amelioration of the Condition of the Wounded and Sick in Armed Forces in the Field
 1949 Geneva Convention II for the Amelioration of the Condition of Wounded, Sick and Shipwrecked Members of Armed Forces at Sea
 1949 Geneva Convention III Relative to the Treatment of Prisoners of War
 1949 Geneva Convention IV Relative to the Protection of Civilian Persons in Time of War
 1954 Hague Convention for the Protection of Cultural Property in the Event of Armed Conflict
 1971 Zagreb Resolution of the Institute of International Law on Conditions of Application of Humanitarian Rules of Armed Conflict to Hostilities in which the United Nations Forces May be Engaged
 1974 United Nations Declaration on the Protection of Women and Children in Emergency and Armed Conflict
 1977 United Nations Convention on the Prohibition of Military or Any Other Hostile Use of Environmental Modification Techniques
 1977 Geneva Protocol I Additional to the Geneva Conventions of 12 August 1949, and Relating to the Protection of Victims of International Armed Conflicts
 1977 Geneva Protocol II Additional to the Geneva Conventions of 12 August 1949, and Relating to the Protection of Victims of Non-International Armed Conflicts
 1978 Red Cross Fundamental Rules of International Humanitarian Law Applicable in Armed Conflicts
 1980 United Nations Convention on Prohibitions or Restrictions on the Use of Certain Conventional Weapons Which May be Deemed to be Excessively Injurious or to Have Indiscriminate Effects (CCW)
 1980 Protocol I on Non-Detectable Fragments
 1980 Protocol II on Prohibitions or Restrictions on the Use of Mines, Booby-Traps and Other Devices
 1980 Protocol III on Prohibitions or Restrictions on the Use of Incendiary Weapons
 1995 Protocol IV on Blinding Laser Weapons
 1996 Amended Protocol II on Prohibitions or Restrictions on the Use of Mines, Booby-Traps and Other Devices
 Protocol on Explosive Remnants of War (Protocol V to the 1980 Convention), 28 November 2003 (entered into force 12 November 2006)
 1994 San Remo Manual on International Law Applicable to Armed Conflicts at Sea
 1994 ICRC/UNGA Guidelines for Military Manuals and Instructions on the Protection of the Environment in Time of Armed Conflict
 1994 UN Convention on the Safety of United Nations and Associated Personnel.
 1996 The International Court of Justice advisory opinion on the Legality of the Threat or Use of Nuclear Weapons
 1997 Ottawa Treaty - Convention on the Prohibition of the Use, Stockpiling, Production and Transfer of Anti-Personnel Mines and on their Destruction
 1998 Rome Statute of the International Criminal Court (entered into force 1 July 2002)
 2000 Optional Protocol on the Involvement of Children in Armed Conflict (entered into force 12 February 2002)
 2005 Geneva Protocol III Additional to the Geneva Conventions of 12 August 1949, and Relating to the Adoption of an Additional Distinctive Emblem
 2008 Convention on Cluster Munitions (entered into force 1 August 2010)
 2017 Treaty on the Prohibition of Nuclear Weapons (entered into force 22 January 2021)

See also

 Arms control (includes list of treaties)
 Command responsibility
 Crimes against humanity
 Customary international humanitarian law
 Debellatio
 International law
 Islamic military jurisprudence
 Journal of International Law of Peace and Armed Conflict
 Jus post bellum
 Law of occupation
 Law of the Sea
 Lawfare
 Lex pacificatoria
 List of Articles of War
 List of weapons of mass destruction treaties
 Right of conquest
 Rule of Law in Armed Conflicts Project (RULAC)
 Self-defence in international law
 Targeted killing
 Total war
 War crime, an act that amounts to a violation of the law of war

Notes

References

Citations

General sources

Further reading

 Witt, John Fabian. Lincoln's Code: The Laws of War in American History (Free Press; 2012) 498 pages; on the evolution and legacy of a code commissioned by President Lincoln in the Civil War

External links
 War & law index—International Committee of the Red Cross website
 International Law of War Association
 The European Institute for International Law and International Relations
 The Rule of Law in Armed Conflicts Project
 Law of War Manual, U.S. Department of Defense (2015, updated December 2016)

 
War